Shiver My Timbers is a 1931 Our Gang short comedy film directed by Robert F. McGowan. It was the 109th (21st talking) Our Gang short that was released.

Plot
A loud sea captain (Billy Gilbert) tells violent stories about adventures out on the sea as pirates. The gang is playing hookey from school in order to hear his stories. Miss Crabtree (June Marlowe) finds where they are and decides to team up with the sea captain to teach the kids a lesson and scare them from ever wanting to be pirates.

The sea captain invites the gang back that night to become pirates. When they board the ship, the sea captain puts on a show and scares the kids. He acts mean and pretends to be sending other pirates overboard. Miss Crabtree even is there and pretending that she would be next to walk the plank. The gang then decides they want to go back to school and take the sea captain seriously.

However, during a staged "raid" on their ship, the children turn the tables on the crewmen.

Cast

The Gang
 Sherwood Bailey as Spud
 Matthew Beard as Stymie
 Dorothy DeBorba as Dorothy
 Bobby Hutchins as Wheezer
 George Ernest as Georgie
 Jerry Tucker as Jerry
 Pete the Pup as himself

Additional cast
 Carlena Beard as Stymie's sister
 Harry Bernard as Cook
 Dick Gilbert as Dick, one of the crew
 Billy Gilbert as The sea captain
 Jack Hill as One of the crew
 June Marlowe as Miss Crabtree
 Charles Oelze as Crew member with funny glasses
 Cy Slocum as Cy, one of the crew

Memorable quote
According to Leonard Maltin, one of the most memorable lines in the history of the movies was spoken in this short. Gilbert has called two of his crew over for mock abuse to scare the kids. He bellows at Harry Bernard, "What are you two doing over there?" Bernard answers, "We don't know!"

Notes
In 1971, the first several minutes, where Billy Gilbert is telling the gang wild pirate stories were edited out due to perceived violence and reinstated in 2001 on prints shown on American Movie Classics until 2003. It was not available on home video VHS tapes until 1994 when it was released on the first round of volumes issued by Cabin Fever.

See also
 Our Gang filmography

References

External links

1931 films
American black-and-white films
1931 comedy films
Films directed by Robert F. McGowan
Metro-Goldwyn-Mayer short films
Pirate films
1931 short films
Our Gang films
1930s American films
1930s English-language films